Doraiswamy Subramanian (born 18 February 1984 in Mumbai, Maharashtra) is an Indian cricketer who plays for Mumbai cricket team. He is a right-handed batsman. He was named in Hung Hom JD Jaguars to play in Hong Kong T20 Blitz a domestic Twenty20 tournament in Hong Kong

References

External links
 
 

1984 births
Living people
Indian cricketers
Mumbai cricketers
Cricketers from Mumbai